The Fecht is a river in the Haut-Rhin department, northeastern France. It flows through Munster and Turckheim. Its longest tributaries are the Weiss and the Strengbach.

References

Rivers of France
Rivers of Grand Est
Rivers of Haut-Rhin